Saint Sarkis Church of Khoy is a medieval Armenian Apostolic church in the city of Khoy, West Azerbaijan Province, Iran (Her in ancient Armenia).

References

See also 
 List of Armenian churches in Iran

 
 

Armenian Apostolic churches in Iran
Churches in Iran
Buildings and structures in West Azerbaijan Province
History of West Azerbaijan Province
Tourist attractions in West Azerbaijan Province